Gymnopilus fibrillosipes is a species of mushroom in the family Hymenogastraceae.

See also

List of Gymnopilus species

External links
Gymnopilus fibrillosipes at Index Fungorum

fibrillosipes
Taxa named by William Alphonso Murrill